is a fighting video game developed by Game Studio and published by Namco. It was released for the Famicom on July 21, 1989 only in Japan. It is one of the earliest versus fighting games with role-playing video game elements.

External links
 Strategy site by One Ten Person (十べえ一人) 

1989 video games
Nintendo Entertainment System games
Nintendo Entertainment System-only games
Namco games
Fighting games
Video games developed in Japan
Multiplayer and single-player video games
Japan-exclusive video games